Aleksandar Vučić (born 5 March 1970) is a Serbian politician serving as the president of Serbia since 2017, and as the president of the Serbian Progressive Party (SNS) since 2012.

Vučić served as the Prime Minister of Serbia in two terms, from 2014 to 2016 and from 2016 until 2017, as well as the deputy prime minister from 2012 until 2014. Furthermore, he served as a member of the Serbian parliament, Minister of Information from 1998 to 2000, and later as Minister of Defence from 2012 to 2013. In April 2017, he was elected president with over 55% of the vote in the first round, thus avoiding a runoff. He formally assumed office on 31 May 2017, succeeding Tomislav Nikolić. His ceremonial inauguration ceremony was held on 23 June 2017.

As Minister of Information under the Slobodan Milošević administration, Vučić introduced restrictive measures against journalists, especially during the Kosovo War. In the period after the Bulldozer Revolution, he was one of the most prominent figures of the opposition. Since the establishment of the new party in 2008, he shifted away from his original far-right and hard Eurosceptic platform toward pro-European, conservative and populist political positions. The SNS-led coalition won the 2012 election and the Serbian Progressive Party became part of the government for the first time, leading to the establishment of the dominant-party system. After he became the head of government in 2014, he promised to continue to follow the accession process to the European Union (EU) by privatizing state businesses and liberalizing the economy.

In December 2015, the EU opened first chapters during the accession conference with the Serbian delegation led by Vučić. He was one of the crucial figures in cooperation and EU-mediated dialogue between the governments of Kosovo and Serbia, advocating the implementation of the Brussels Agreement on the normalization of their relations. Following United States-mediated negotiations, he signed an agreement in September 2020 to normalize economic relations with Kosovo, and also to move the Serbian embassy in Israel to Jerusalem. He is one of the initiators of Open Balkan (formerly known as Mini Schengen Zone), an economic zone of Balkan countries intended to guarantee "four freedoms". Observers have described Vučić's rule as an authoritarian, autocratic or illiberal democratic regime, citing curtailed press freedom.

Early life and education
Aleksandar Vučić was born in Belgrade to Anđelko Vučić and Angelina Milovanov. He has a younger brother, Andrej.

His paternal ancestors came from Čipuljić, near Bugojno, in Central Bosnia. They were expelled by the Croatian fascists (Ustaše) during World War II and settled near Belgrade, where his father was born. According to Vučić, his paternal grandfather Anđelko and tens of other close relatives were killed by the Ustaše.

His mother was born in Bečej in Vojvodina. Both of his parents were economics graduates. His father worked as an economist, and his mother as a journalist.

Vučić was raised in New Belgrade, where he attended the Branko Radičević Elementary School, and later a gymnasium in Zemun. He graduated from the University of Belgrade Faculty of Law. He learned English in Brighton, England, and worked as a merchant in London for some time. After returning to Yugoslavia, he worked as a journalist in Pale, SR Bosnia and Herzegovina. There, he interviewed politician Radovan Karadžić and once played chess with general Ratko Mladić. As a youngster, Vučić was a fan of Red Star Belgrade, often attending their matches, including the one played between Dinamo Zagreb and Red Star on 13 May 1990, which turned into a huge riot. The homes of his relatives were destroyed in the Bosnian War.

Political career
Vučić joined the Serbian Radical Party (SRS) in 1993, a far right party whose core ideology is based on Serbian nationalism and the goal of creating a Greater Serbia, and was elected to the National Assembly following the 1993 parliamentary election. Two years later, Vučić became secretary-general of the SRS. He was one of the SRS's volunteers who visited the army that kept Sarajevo under the siege.
After his party won the local elections in Zemun in 1996, he became the director of Pinki Hall, which was his first employment.

Minister of Information (1998–2000)

In March 1998, Vučić was appointed Minister of Information in the government of Mirko Marjanović. Scholars described Vučić as the crucial figure in the shaping of turn-of-the century media policies in Serbia. Following rising resentment against Milošević, Vučić introduced fines for journalists who criticized the government and banned foreign TV networks. He recalled in 2014 that he was wrong and had changed, stating "I was not ashamed to confess all my political mistakes".

During this period, Serbian media was accused for broadcasting Serbian nationalist propaganda, which demonized ethnic minorities and legitimized Serb atrocities against them. In 1998, the government adopted Europe's most restrictive media law by the end of the 20th century, which created a special misdemeanor court to try violations. It had the ability to impose heavy fines and to confiscate property if they were not immediately paid. Serbian media were under severe repression of the state, and that foreign media had been seen as "foreign elements" and "spies". Human Rights Watch reported that five independent newspaper editors were charged with disseminating misinformation because they referred to Albanians who had died in Kosovo as "people" rather than "terrorists". The government crackdown on independent media intensified when NATO forces were threatening intervention in Kosovo in late September and early October 1998. Furthermore, the government also maintained direct control of state radio and television, which provided news for the majority of the population. After the NATO bombing of Yugoslavia began in March 1999, Vučić called for a meeting of all Belgrade's editors. Print media were ordered to submit all copies to the Ministry for approval and they were allowed to publish only official statements and information taken from media outlets, which either are controlled by the state or practice radical self-censorship. Also, Vučić ordered all NATO countries journalists to leave the country.

Radical Party to Progressive Party

Tomislav Nikolić, deputy leader of the Radical Party and de facto interim leader due to absence of Vojislav Šešelj, resigned on 6 September 2008 because of disagreement with Šešelj over the party's support for Serbia's EU membership. With some other well-known Radical Party members he formed a new parliamentary club called "Napred Srbijo!" (Forward Serbia!). On 12 September 2008 Nikolić and his group were officially ejected from the Radical Party on the session of SRS leadership. Vučić, as secretary-general was called to attend this session, but he did not appear. Tomislav Nikolić announced he would form his own party and called Vučić to join. Vučić, one of the most popular figures among SRS supporters, resigned from Radical Party on 14 September 2008. The next day, Vučić announced his temporary withdrawal from politics.

On 6 October 2008, Vučić confirmed in a TV interview that he was to join the newly formed Nikolić's Serbian Progressive Party (SNS) and that he would be the Deputy President of the party. He then seemed to change his positions. In 2010 he made statements such as a "horrible crime was committed in Srebrenica", saying he felt "ashamed" of the Serbs who did it. "I do not hide that I have changed... I am proud of that," he told AFP in an interview in 2012. "I was wrong, I thought I was doing the best for my country, but I saw the results and we failed, We need to admit that."

Nikolić stepped down as party leader on 24 May 2012 following his election as President of Serbia. Vučić assumed leadership until the next party congress is held to elect a new leader. On 29 September 2012 Vučić was elected as party leader, with Jorgovanka Tabaković as his deputy.

Minister of Defence and First Deputy Prime Minister (2012–2014) 

Vučić briefly served as Minister of Defence and First Deputy Prime Minister from July 2012 to August 2013, when he stepped down from his position of Defence Minister in a cabinet reshuffle. Although the Prime Minister, Ivica Dačić Deba, held formal power as head-of-government, many analysts thought that Vučić had the most influence in government as head of the largest party in the governing coalition and parliament.

Prime Minister (2014–2017)

2014 parliamentary election

As a result of the 2014 parliamentary election, Vučić's Serbian Progressive Party won 158 out of 250 seats in Parliament and formed a ruling coalition with the Socialist Party of Serbia. Vučić was elected Prime Minister of Serbia.

2016 parliamentary election

At a party conference of his ruling Serbian Progressive Party, Vučić announced early general elections, citing that: 'He wants to ensure that the country has stable rule that its current political direction will continue – including its attempt to secure membership of the EU.'
On 4 March 2016, Serbian President, Tomislav Nikolić, dissolved the parliament, scheduling early elections for 24 April. 
The ruling coalition around Vučić's SNS obtained 48.25% of the vote.
Vučić's ruling SNS retained majority in the parliament, despite winning less seats than in 2014 parliamentary election. The coalition around SNS won 131 seats, 98 of which belong to SNS.

2017 presidential election

Vučić announced his candidacy in the presidential election on 14 February 2017, despite earlier statements that he would not run. According to the Constitution, Serbia is a parliamentary republic in which the presidency is largely ceremonial with no significant executive power.

After initial speculations that the incumbent president, Tomislav Nikolić, would also run, he backed Vučić and his ruling SNS party. Vučić won the election in the first round, having obtained 56.01 percent of the vote. The independent candidate, Saša Janković was second with 16.63 percent, ahead of satirical politician Luka Maksimović and former Minister of Foreign Affairs Vuk Jeremić.

A public opinion survey, carried out by CeSID, showed that significant proportions of Vučić supporters are composed of pensioners (41%) and that a large majority of them (63%) hold secondary education degrees, while 21% don't even have a high school degree.

President (2017–present) 

The election result sparked protests around Serbia. Thousands of protesters accused Vučić of leading the country towards authoritarianism. Protesters organised the rallies through social media, insisted that they are not linked to any party or politician, and demanded a total overhaul of what they call "corrupt political, business and media systems that serve an elite led by Mr Vučić". Vučić maintained that the protests were organized by his political opponents who expected "the dictator would bring the police into the streets."

However, Vučić was sworn in as President of Serbia on 31 May, in front of Parliament. He promised to continue with reforms and said Serbia will remain on a European path. He also said Serbia will maintain military neutrality, but continue to build partnerships with both NATO and Russia.

After becoming president, Vučić disbanded the traditional police security service responsible for President's protection, and replaced it with members of the Cobras, military police unit which contrary to the law, protected him while he served as the Prime Minister from 2014 to 2017.

During late 2018 and early 2019, thousands of Serbians took to the streets to protest the presidency of Vučić. The protesters accused Vučić and the SNS of corruption and stated that Vučić is trying to cement himself as an autocrat, which he denied. In 2019, Freedom House's report downgraded Serbia's status from Free to Partly Free due to the deterioration in the conduct of elections, continued attempts by the government and allied media outlets to undermine independent journalists through legal harassment and smear campaigns, and Vučić's accumulation of executive powers that conflict with his constitutional role. 

After Vučić's announcement of the reintroduction of lockdown in July 2020 due to the COVID-19 pandemic, thousands of people protested, accusing the government of missteps in handling of the pandemic, including the premature lifting of restrictions and downplaying the risk to hold the elections. Some analysts said that they had not witnessed police brutality which occurred during the protest since the Slobodan Milošević's regime.

According to Amnesty International's annual report for 2021, Vučić's mandate is characterised by human rights violations, restrictions on freedom of expression and campaigns of harassment against the opposition figures, journalists and media outlets.

Vučić participated in the 2022 general election as the presidential candidate of the Serbian Progressive Party. He won 58% of the popular vote in the first round, and secured his second mandate as president of Serbia. Vučić announced the formation of the People's Movement for the State in March 2023.

Policies

Economy

After his election as Prime Minister in 2014, Vučić promoted austerity-based economic policies, whose aim was to reduce Serbia's budget deficit. Vučić's policy of fiscal consolidation was primarily aimed at cuts in the public sector. One of the measures was the reduction of pensions and salaries in the public sector as well as a ban on further employment in the public sector. Vučić announced that his reform based policies have reduced country's deficit, and contributed to financial stability. However, criticism of Vučić's economic policy stated that his measures have not overall contributed to economic recovery, but have instead caused a further decline in living standard.
On 23 February 2015, Vučić's government has concluded a three-year stand-by arrangement with the IMF worth €1.2 billion as a precautionary measure to secure the country's long term fiscal stability. The IMF has praised the reforms as has the EU calling them one of the most successful programmes the IMF has ever had. The GDP of Serbia has surpassed the pre crisis of 2008 levels as have the salaries. The economic prospects are good with GDP growth rising above 3% and the debt to GDP ratio falling below 68%

Fight against corruption and organized crime

Vučić has pledged to tackle corruption and organized crime in Serbia. He also vowed to investigate controversial privatizations and ties between tycoons and former government members.

On the other hand, data from the Transparency International showed that a significant increase in perceived corruption was seen exactly from 2012, when Vučić came into power. According to research conducted by the Centre for Investigative Journalism, the battle against corruption in practice comes down to media announcements and arrests in front of cameras. "They are followed by a large number of criminal charges, significantly fewer indictments, and even fewer convictions".

EU and Immigration policy

During the 2015 – 2016 European migrant crisis, Vučić strongly aligned himself with the policies of the German Chancellor, Angela Merkel, and publicly praised German migration policy. Vučić also stated that Serbia will cooperate with the EU in solving the migrant stream going from the Middle East to EU member countries through the Balkan route, and that Serbia will be ready to take some portion of the migrants. "Serbia will receive a certain number of migrants. This makes us more European than some member states. We don't build fences," Vučić wrote on Twitter, while criticizing the migrant policies of some EU member countries.

Policy towards Kosovo 

Until the new coalition government was formed in 2012, during the time he served as the secretary general of the Serbian Radical Party, the largest opposition party at the time, as well as during his position of the vice president of then newly formed Serbian Progressive Party, in 2008, Vučić was highly critical towards Koštunica and Cvetković's administrations, and offered a "reversal" of the agreements made by Borko Stefanović and the other officials during the negotiation process. However, upon forming the government Vucic stated how "we [the government of Serbia] cannot pretend that that [the former administration] was some different state which made the deals".

Vučić was one of the key political figures in the negotiation process on Serbia's bid for EU accession, traveling to Brussels for talks with the EU's Foreign Affairs High Commissioner, Baroness Ashton, as well as to North Mitrovica to discuss the details of a political settlement between on behalf of the Government of Serbia and Kosovo administration. During his visit to North Kosovo, to garner support for the Brussels-brokered deal, he urged Kosovo Serbs to "leave the past and think about the future".

In 2017, Vučić criticized the EU for "hypocrisy and double standards over its very different attitude towards separatist crises in Kosovo and Catalonia". In September 2018 in a speech to Kosovo Serbs he stated: "Slobodan Milošević was a great Serbian leader, he had the best intentions, but our results were far worse." Journalists report that Vučić advocates the partition of Kosovo, in what he refers to as "ethnic demarcation with Albanians".

On 27 May 2019, during a special session of the Serbian parliament on Kosovo, Vučić said: "We need to recognize that we have been defeated... We lost the territory", while also criticizing the 'unprincipled attitude of great powers' and "no one reacting to announcements for the formation of a Greater Albania". He stated that Serbia no longer controlled Kosovo and that a compromise was needed on the issue through a future referendum in the country. Vučić has close links to the Serb List and he invited Kosovo Serbs to vote for them in the elections.

On 20 January 2020, Serbia and Kosovo agreed to restore flights between their capitals for the first time in more than two decades. The deal came after months of diplomatic talks by Richard Grenell, the United States ambassador to Germany, who was named special envoy for Serbia-Kosovo relations by President Donald Trump the year before. Vućić welcomed the flights agreement and tweeted his thanks to American diplomats.

On 4 September 2020 Serbia and Kosovo signed an agreement at the White House in Washington D.C., in the presence of US President Donald Trump. In addition to the economic agreement, Serbia agreed to move its Israeli embassy to Jerusalem from Tel Aviv starting in June 2021 and Israel and Kosovo agreed to mutually recognise each other.

Open Balkan 

On 10 October 2019, together with Edi Rama, Prime Minister of Albania, and Zoran Zaev, Prime Minister of North Macedonia, Vučić signed the so-called Mini Schengen (now known as Open Balkan) deal on regional economic cooperation, including on the free movement of goods, capital, services, and labour between their three countries, while they await progress on EU enlargement. A month later, the leaders presented a set of proposals to achieve the "four freedoms" and the first steps towards them, including the possibility to the open border area. In December, the three leaders also met with Milo Đukanović, President of Montenegro, opening the possibility for the country to join the zone. Following the 2020 Kosovo and Serbia economic agreement the two sides pledged to join the Mini Schengen Zone.

Relations with Croatia 

In 2007 Vučić stated that the Democratic League of Croats in Vojvodina is a branch of the Croatian Democratic Union. In 2008, with the establishment of the Serbian Progressive Party, Vučić said that the goal of a Greater Serbia taking Croatian territory up to the proposed Virovitica-Karlovac-Karlobag line "is unrealistic and silly". The Croatian newspaper Jutarnji list claimed in a reportage that none of his family members had been killed during World War II, upon which he replied that these were "brutal lies and attacks on his family".

During 2015 and 2016, relations between Croatia and Serbia were further affected by to the ongoing migrant crisis, when Croatia decided to close its border with Serbia. In September 2015, Croatia barred all cargo traffic from Serbia, due to the migrant influx coming from Serbia in a move which further eroded the fragile relations between the two countries. 
In response to these actions, Vučić announced that counter measures will be enacted if an agreement with Croatia is not reached. 
The dispute was eventually resolved through the mediation of the EU Commission, yet the relations between the two neighboring countries remain fragile. 
On 31 March 2016, Vojislav Seselj, leader of the Serbian Radical Party, was acquitted of War Crime charges in the Hague Tribunal for Former Yugoslavia. The verdict has caused controversy in Croatia. Vučić distanced himself from Šešelj and his policy, but stated that the verdict should not be used as a tool for political pressure on Serbia.

On 7 April 2016 Croatia refused to endorse the EU Commission opinion to open Chapter 23, a part of Serbia's EU accession negotiations, thus effectively blocking Serbia’ EU integration process. Serbia accused Croatia of obstructing its EU membership, and Vučić said that his government was: "Stunned by Croatia's decision not to support Serbia's European path."
Croatia has not agreed for Serbia to open negotiations of Chapter 23. 
On 14 April 2016, the EU Commission rejected Croatian arguments in its dispute with Serbia.

Relations with Russia

Vučić has maintained traditional good relations between Serbia and Russia, and his government refused to enact sanctions on Russia, following the crisis in Ukraine and the Annexation of Crimea. Vučić has repeatedly announced that Serbia will remain committed to its European integration, but also maintain historic relations with Russia. 
"We have proven our sincere and friendly attitude to Russia by being one of the European countries that refused to impose sanctions on Russia," Vučić said after meeting with Russian Prime Minister Dmitry Medvedev. "Serbia will continue pursuing this policy in the future."

During Vučić’s mandate, Serbia has continued to expand its economic ties with Russia, especially by increasing Serbian exports to Russia. In early 2016, after a meeting with the Russian Deputy Prime Minister Dmitry Rogozin, Vučić announced the possibility of Serbia boosting its military cooperation with Russia by purchasing Russian missile systems.

In December 2017, Vučić made an official visit to the Russian Federation for the first time as the President of Serbia. He expressed his gratefulness to Russia for protecting Serbian national interests, and stated that: "Serbia will never impose sanctions on the Russian Federation (in relation to the international sanctions during the Ukrainian crisis)". During his visit, he focused on strengthening cooperation in the field of military industry and energy.

On 25 February 2022, Vučić said Serbia would not impose sanctions against Russia during the 2022 Russian-Ukraine War.

Relations with the United States 

In July 2017 Vučić visited the United States and met with U.S. Vice President Mike Pence, where they discussed U.S. support for Serbia's efforts to join the European Union, the need for continued reforms, and further progress in normalizing the relationship with Kosovo. Referencing the proposed land swap arrangement between Serbia and Kosovo, U.S. national security advisor John Bolton has said that the United States would not oppose a territorial exchange between Kosovo and Serbia to resolve their long-running dispute. The U.S. State Department continues to maintain that the full normalization of relations between Serbia and Kosovo is "essential for regional stability", which Vučić has said before.

Relations with China 

Vučić has sought closer cooperation with China. He has met with Chinese president Xi Jinping in 2016, 2018, and 2019. After meeting with Chinese Minister of Foreign Affairs Wang Yi, he secured Chinese help in combating the COVID-19 pandemic in Serbia through delivery of PPE and CoronaVac vaccine doses, which has contributed to Serbia leading COVID-19 vaccination rates in Europe.

The media 

In 2014, Dunja Mijatović, OSCE Representative on Freedom of the Media, wrote Vučić and made attention with the suppression of the media, which he denied and demanded an apology from OSCE. According to the 2015 Freedom House report and the 2017 Amnesty International report, media outlets and journalists has become subject to pressure after criticizing the government of Prime Minister Aleksandar Vučić. Also, Serbian media are heavily dependent on advertising contracts and government subsidies which make journalists and media outlets exposed to economic pressures, such as payment defaults, termination of contracts and the like. Four popular political talk TV programs were cancelled in 2014, including the renowned political talk show Utisak nedelje by Olja Bećković, running since 24 years and well known for its critical scrutiny of all governments since. In first report after Vučić took the office, European Commission expressed concerns about deteriorating conditions for the full exercise of freedom of expression. Report said there was a growing trend of self-censorship which combined with undue influence on editorial policies. Reports published in 2016 and 2018 stated that no progress was made to improve conditions for the full exercise of freedom of expression. In July 2016, the ruling party organized an exhibition of government-critical press articles and social media posts, labeled as ‘lies’, saying that they wanted to document wrongful attacks and to prove there is no official censorship. In 2017, Freedom House reported that Serbia posted one of the largest single-year declines in press freedom among all the countries and territories. Also, they emphasized that Vučić had sought to squeeze critical media out of the market and discredit the few journalists with the funds and fortitude to keep working. Some commentators have described that Vučić built the cult of personality, with the significant role of mass media.

Observers described that during the campaign for the 2017 presidential election, Vučić had ten times more airtime on national broadcasters than all other candidates combined and mainstream media under Vučić's control have been demonizing most of the opposition presidential candidates, without giving them the opportunity to respond. Organizations that observed the elections emphasized that the presence of Vučić in newspaper and the electronic media during the presidential campaign was disproportionate, adding that media have lost their critical role and that they have become a means of political propaganda. The OSCE Report explains that general reluctance of media to report critically on or to challenge the governing authorities, significantly reduced the amount of impartial information available to voters. They also mentioned that the government used public resources to support Vučić. Amnesty International and Human Rights Watch reported harassment and physical assaults on journalists during the presidential inauguration ceremony, after Vučić won the elections.

In 2018, International Research & Exchanges Board described the situation in the media in Serbia as the worst in recent history, and that Media Sustainability Index dropped because the most polarized media in almost 20 years, an increase in fake news and editorial pressure on media. They also pointed out that the judiciary responds promptly only in cases in which the media allegedly violates the rights of authorities and ruling parties. The increased government control of the media comes as Serbian journalists face more political pressure and intimidation, in 2018 the Independent Association of Serbian Journalists recorded the highest number of attacks against journalists in decade. According to Serbian investigative journalism portal Crime and Corruption Reporting Network, more than 700 fake news were published on the front pages of pro-government tabloids during 2018. Many of them were about alleged attacks on Vućić and attempts of coups, as well as messages of support to him by Vladimir Putin. The best-selling newspaper in Serbia is the pro-government tabloid Informer, which most often presents Vučić as a powerful person under constant attack, and also has anti-European content and pro-war rhetoric. After Vučić was hospitalized for cardiovascular problems in November 2019, his associates and pro-regime media accused the journalists of worsening the president's health by asking questions about alleged corruption by government ministers. The Council of Europe warned that the investigative outlet was target of smear campaign from the state after they caught Vučić's son with members of crime groups, while the Organized Crime and Corruption Reporting Project reported that Vučić "pledges to fight the lies". In early November 2021, seven US congressman have accused Vučić of deepening corruption and putting pressure on the media.

Internet surveillance 
Since Vučić's party came to power, Serbia has seen a surge of internet trolls and pages on social networks praising the government and attacking its critics, free media and the opposition in general. That includes a handful of dedicated employees running fake accounts, but also the Facebook page associated with a Serbian franchise of the far-right Breitbart News website. On 26 March 2020, Twitter announced that they had shut down a network of 8,500 spam accounts that worked in concert to write 43 million tweets praising president Vučić and his party, boosting Vučić-aligned content to increase its visibility and popularity, and attacking his political opponents.

Criticism and controversies

Public profile

Some have compared Vučić to other strongmen in European politics and, as noted above, accused him of being an autocrat.

Greater Serbia
Until 2008, Vučić was a disciple of the Greater Serbia ideology, which he testified was envisaged as extending to a western border running along the Virovitica–Karlovac–Karlobag line. In 1995, during the Croatian War of Independence, Vučić said in Glina (which was at the time controlled by Serbs rebels) that 'Serbian Krajina' and Glina would never be Croatian, Banovina would never be returned to Croatia, and that if Serbian Radical Party had won elections, Serbs would have lived in Greater Serbia. In another speech from the early 2000s, Vučić called Karlobag, Ogulin, Karlovac and Virovitica "Serbian towns", stated that "they [SRS's critics] rejoice that Ustaše (referring to Croats) have occupied Serbian lands and want to convince us Serbian radicals that it wasn't Serbian, that we were saying nonsenses. (...) We want what's ours, Serbian." After split from the Serbian Radical Party and creation of the Serbian Progressive Party, Vučić said he no longer supports the Greater Serbia ideology.

On 1 September 2020, Montenegrin President Milo Đukanović accused Vučić and Belgrade-based media of interfering in the internal politics of Montenegro, as well of alleged trying to revive a "Greater Serbia policy".

Srebrenica massacre and Ratko Mladić 
Only a few days after more than 8,000 Muslim Bosniaks were killed by the Army of Republika Srpska (VRS) and paramilitary groups from Serbia in the Srebrenica massacre, Vučić said on 20 July 1995 in the National Assembly in a comment on the NATO bombing campaign against the VRS positions that "for every Serb killed, we will kill 100 Muslims". In 2015, he said that his statement from 1995 was "taken out of context" and "that was not the essence of that sentence."

Before leaving the Radical Party of Vojislav Šešelj, Vučić openly and publicly celebrated and called for the protection of Ratko Mladić, a military leader convicted of committing war crimes, crimes against humanity, and genocide. In 2007, while Mladić was still at large in Serbia, Vučić distributed posters with the declaration "Safe House for General Mladić". During a parliament session he stated that the Serbian Parliament will always protect and be a safe house for the general and that any house in Serbia that bears the last name of Vučić will protect and shelter Mladić.

In the same year, Vučić organized a street protest during which street signs with the name of the assassinated pro-western Serbian PM were replaced with Ratko Mladić Boulevard street signs. This vandalism has become a frequent activity of Serbian ultra-right groups on the anniversary of the Zoran Đinđić assassination.

Vučić also participated in protests against the arrests of war criminals convicted later, including Veselin Šljivančanin, Radovan Karadžić, and Vojislav Šešelj, who was president of his party.

Slavko Ćuruvija 
It was during Vučić's term as the Minister of Information that Slavko Ćuruvija, a prominent journalist who reported on the Kosovo War, was murdered in a state-sponsored assassination. In 1999, before the assassination took place, Vučić gave a front page interview to the tabloid Argument in which he stated "I will have my revenge on Slavko Ćuruvija for all the lies published in Dnevni telegraf (Ćuruvija's paper). In 2014, Vučić apologized to the Ćuruvija family for having waited so long to bring the perpetrators to justice, and thanked everyone who was involved in solving the case for their work. Branka Prpa, Ćuruvija's common-law spouse, said Vučić participated in the murder and that he is the creator of the practice of persecution of journalists.

Personal life

On 27 July 1997, Vučić married Ksenija Janković, a journalist at Radio Index and Srpska reč. The couple had two children before divorcing in 2011. Janković died on 29 January 2022. On 14 December 2013, Vučić married Tamara Đukanović, a diplomat with the Ministry of Foreign Affairs of Serbia. On 9 June 2017, a week after Vučić took the presidential office, his wife gave birth to a son.

Outside of Serbian, he is fluent in Russian, English and German. He learned Russian in a Belgrade high school and every second day of the week took a Russian language course to improve his knowledge. 

During the opposition period, he has frequently appeared in popular TV shows. In 2006, Vučić became the winner of the first season of the Serbian version of The Pyramid, a talk show with a competitive element broadcast on Pink TV. He was the first politician who participated in the humanitarian dance contest Plesom do snova (in 2009) and the first politician to guest-star on a late-night talk show Veče sa Ivanom Ivanovićem (in 2010). He also was a guest judge in one episode of the third season of Zvezde Granda, the most popular music competition in Balkans.

On 15 November 2019, he was hospitalized at a military hospital in Belgrade due to apparent "cardiovascular issues". Three days later it was reported that he was released. Some, including his media advisor and the deputy mayor of Belgrade, have claimed that his health problems were in part due to pressure from journalists. Vučić explicitly denied this at a media conference shortly after his hospital stay, stating that these health issues were chronic in nature.

On 8 April 2020, it was revealed that Vučić's 22-year-old son, Danilo, had contracted the coronavirus and was admitted to the Infectious Diseases Clinic in Belgrade.

During July 2020 Vučić became a student at Belgrade's College of sports and health, with the goal to become a basketball trainer for juniors after he ends his political career. Some Serbian journalists have reported that a mandatory condition for entering the College was active participation in sports for three years, which was removed from the official website shortly after Vučić's enrolment.

Honours

Orders

Honorary doctorates

Honorary citizenship

Other 
Gold Medal of Merit of the City of Athens
Friends of Zion Award

References

Sources

Other sources

External links

Aleksandar Vučić profile at the Council of Europe website

|-

|-

|-

|-

|-

1970 births
Living people
Candidates for President of Serbia
Deputy Prime Ministers of Serbia
Politicians from Belgrade
Presidents of Serbia
Prime Ministers of Serbia
Members of the National Assembly (Serbia)
Serbian nationalists
Serbian people of Bosnia and Herzegovina descent
Serbian Progressive Party politicians
Serbian Radical Party politicians
University of Belgrade Faculty of Law alumni
Defence ministers of Serbia
21st-century Serbian politicians
Collars of the Order of the White Lion
Recipients of the Order of Alexander Nevsky
Grand Crosses of the Order of Saint-Charles